Karla Kienzl (born Karoline Hauser, sometimes listed as Carla Kienzl; 21 October 1922 – 2 September 2018) was an Austrian luger who competed during the 1950s. She won the gold medal in the women's singles event at the 1955 FIL World Luge Championships in Oslo, Norway. Karla Kienzl was the first World champion in luge in this event.

Kienzl also won three medals in the women's singles event at the European luge championships with one gold (1951) and two silvers (1954, 1955). Kienzl's husband Fritz Kienzl was a European champion in Luge. Karla and Fritz had two children, Wolfgang and Michael.

Karla Kienzl died on 2 September 2018 at the age of 95.

References

Austrian female lugers
2018 deaths
1922 births
People from Liezen District
Sportspeople from Styria